Kangaroo Point may refer to:

New South Wales, Australia 

Kangaroo Point, New South Wales, a suburb in Sutherland Shire, Sydney, New South Wales, Australia
Kangaroo Point, a point of land in the suburb of Brooklyn, New South Wales

Queensland, Australia 

Kangaroo Point, Queensland, a suburb in Brisbane, Queensland, Australia
 Kangaroo Point Cliffs, located in the suburb of Kangaroo Point, Queensland